Perach is a municipality in the district of  Altötting in Bavaria in Germany. It lies on the river Inn.

References

Altötting (district)
Populated places on the Inn (river)